Biggleswade railway station serves the town of Biggleswade in Bedfordshire, England. The station is managed by Great Northern, although most services are operated by Thameslink.

Biggleswade station was originally built in 1850 for the Great Northern railway. The original station consisted of two lines but was rebuilt in 1901 to allow the present four line arrangement to be built.

Biggleswade has two large platforms and four main rail lines, a pair of "up and down" slow lines used by stopping services and a pair of "up and down" fast lines used by fast InterCity East Coast passing through at high speed and Great Northern services at peak times running non-stop to/from London. A fifth line extends off the "down" slow line which links into the remaining sidings used by the Plasmor block company.

The station's platforms have been lengthened so that they can cope with 12 car trains, which are now serving the station. The station currently has four 12-car services in the morning and two in the evening. Larger numbers of 12-car services will serve the station following the completion of the Thameslink Programme.

The large waiting room platform is listed Grade II on the National Heritage List for England.

Facilities

Following a £60,000 refurbishment in July 2009  by former franchise holder First Capital Connect  the station now has two waiting rooms on Platforms 1/2, and also a small cafe at the bottom of the stairs. Platforms 3/4 currently only have a small shelter. The station has another small cafe in the old station buildings, as well as a ticket office.

There are two modern touch screen ticket machines located in front of the booking office, and both sheltered and secure cycle storage is provided next to the station buildings. There are four helpoints located at various points in the station, including one in the main car park.

Biggleswade station does not currently have automatic ticket gates, and is unlikely to do so in the future, as with the current footbridge it is not possible.

Services
Off-peak, all services at Biggleswade are operated by Thameslink using  EMUs.

The typical off-peak service in trains per hour is:
 2 tph to  via ,  and 

On Sundays, the service is reduced to hourly and southbound services run to London King's Cross instead of Horsham.

History

Biggleswade station was once a busy goods yard with several sidings used for loading trains of market produce to be taken to London markets. The decline of this led to a reduction in the use of the station, and it is now used solely for passenger traffic. Plasmor Concrete Products Ltd owns the yard where the former goods depot was sited. These lines into the sidings are still active with train workings of breeze block bricks brought down from Heck to Biggleswade, where they are then unloaded onto lorries for distribution. The goods depot, stables and weighbridge office have all now been demolished but the old goods weighbridge remains on site as well as the remains of a luggage/parcels weighbridge next to the station building, although out of use.

Biggleswade also had a signal box but this was closed when semaphore signals were replaced in the early 1970s. The station was used as a Red Star parcel office but this was closed in the mid 1980s when parcel traffic was forced to use Stevenage station. The line through the station was electrified in 1988, as part of the wider ECML electrification scheme. Prior to that (from 1977 to 1988), local services only operated between  &  outside of peak hours.

Gallery

References

External links

Railway stations in Bedfordshire
DfT Category D stations
Former Great Northern Railway stations
Railway stations in Great Britain opened in 1850
Railway stations served by Govia Thameslink Railway
Biggleswade
Buildings and structures in Biggleswade